Edward Mathers may refer to:
 Edward Powys Mathers, English translator and poet
 Edward Peter Mathers, his father, British author, editor, and newspaper proprietor